Simon Baldwin (born 31 March 1975) is an English former professional rugby league footballer who played in the 1990s and 2000s who played as a , or .

Baldwin started his career at Leigh before joining Halifax Blue Sox in October 1994. He then spent a season with Sheffield Eagles in 1999. After a second spell at Leigh, he joined Salford City Reds in 2003. He left the club in 2006, and went on to play for Rochdale Hornets and Oldham.

While at Halifax, he also represented Great Britain under-21s,  and England in 1995.

References

External links 
(archived by web.archive.org) Salford Squad Profile: Simon Baldwin

1975 births
Living people
England national rugby league team players
English rugby league players
Great Britain under-21 national rugby league team players
Halifax R.L.F.C. players
Leigh Leopards players
Oldham R.L.F.C. players
Rochdale Hornets players
Rugby league second-rows
Salford Red Devils players
Sheffield Eagles (1984) players